Yannick Fischer, born 17 December 1974 in Sainte-Foy-la-Grande is a French former professional footballer who played as a defender.

Fischer counts Girondins Bordeaux and Olympique de Marseille as his former clubs. Whilst at Strasbourg he played in the 2001 Coupe de France Final in which they beat Amiens SC on penalties.

References

External links
 
 Profile  at lfp.fr

1974 births
Living people
French people of German descent
French footballers
Association football defenders
FC Girondins de Bordeaux players
AS Cannes players
Olympique de Marseille players
FC Lorient players
RC Strasbourg Alsace players
Le Mans FC players
Chamois Niortais F.C. players